The Netherlands has participated in the Eurovision Song Contest 62 times since making its debut as one of the seven countries at the first contest in . The country has missed only four contests, twice because the dates coincided with Remembrance of the Dead (1985, 1991) and twice because of being relegated due to poor results the previous year (1995 and 2002). The Netherlands hosted the contest in Hilversum, Amsterdam, twice in The Hague ( and ) and Rotterdam.

The Netherlands has won the contest five times, with Corry Brokken, Teddy Scholten, Lenny Kuhr in a four-way tie, Teach-In and Duncan Laurence. The country's other top five results are Sandra and Andres fourth, Mouth and MacNeal third, Maggie MacNeal fifth , Marcha fifth, Edsilia Rombley fourth, and second with The Common Linnets.

After the introduction of semi-finals in 2004, the Netherlands failed to reach the final for eight years in a row from 2005 to 2012, but has since reached eight of the last nine finals.

History

1956–1959: Quick success

The Netherlands was one of seven countries competing in the inaugural  contest. NTS presented the Nationaal Songfestival to select Dutch entries to the contest. Corry Brokken and Jetty Paerl finished top two and qualified to Lugano. After a year, success came fast as "Net als toen" from Brokken won the 1957 contest in Frankfurt, receiving points from every single country. Sem Nijveen provided the violin solo. As a result, NTS hosted the 1958 contest in Hilversum. Brokken's "Heel de wereld" received the first point from the first voting country, Switzerland, but it turned out to be the only point for her and finished tied ninth and last. Hosting and finishing last would not be repeated until Portugal in 2018; Austria in 2015 scored zero points alongside Germany but finished second last due to tie-breaking rules. In 1959 in Cannes, the Netherlands was represented by Teddy Scholten with "Een beetje", a song about being unfaithful in a relationship. The UK led the voting, before Italy sent seven points and France sent four more for another Dutch victory.

1960–1968: Dark age

Rudi Carrell and Annie Palmen won the national final with "Wat een geluk" in 1960 before Carrell was selected for the night but the song finished 12th (second last). Greetje Kauffeld failed to win three selections before being internally selected in 1961 with Wat een dag, which finished tied tenth. De Spelbrekers won with "Katinka". This song is in the distinguished list for finishing last with 0 points but still being the more-remembered entries in the Netherlands from the dark age. In 1963, The members of the orchestra went on strike, which made the televised selection impossible. Palmen performed three songs for juries before "Geen ander", later renamed "Een speeldoos" was selected. The song once again finished tied last with zero points. Dutch-Indonesian Anneke Grönloh with "Jij bent mijn leven" finished tied tenth in 1964. The 1965 Nationaal Songfestival had five semi-finals to select the song for each entrant. It was hosted by Teddy Scholten. Conny Vandenbos won with "'t Is genoeg". Norway gave was the only country to give any points, the maximum 5 points, making the Netherlands finish 11th. Milly Scott was the first black performer to participate in 1966, Ireland and United Kingdom both gave "Fernando en Filippo" 1 point, having the Netherlands finish 15th. Harmelen hosted the 1967 selection. Winner Thérèse Steinmetz finished 14th with "Ring-dinge-ding". In 1968, the Netherlands finished last again with "Morgen" from Ronnie Tober.

1969–1975: From Lenny Kuhr to Teach-In
The 1969 Nationaal Songfestival brought Europe together by asking every single participating country in 1969 to vote with the Dutch juries. Conny Vink's "De toeteraar" was beaten by Lenny Kuhr's "De troubadour". Dolf van der Linden refused to go to Madrid and the song was conducted by Frans de Kok. The last two countries brought the Netherlands, France, the UK and Spain tied in first place with 18 points. Because there was no tie-breaking rule in place at the time, all 4 countries were announced as winners, which led to multiple countries withdrawing in 1970. The Netherlands beat France in coin-toss to host the Eurovision Song Contest 1970 in RAI Amsterdam. Hearts of Soul finished 7th with "Waterman". Saskia and Serge finished second in 1970 national final before being internally selected for 1971. The ballad "Tijd" finished tied sixth that night. It was the last song Dolf van der Linden conducted after 13 songs were conducted by him, of which two victories. Sandra and Andres's "Als het om de liefde gaat" was the first entry where the audience clapped along. The Netherlands finished fourth, one point behind Germany. After "De oude muzikant" from Ben Cramer finished 14th in 1973, the country sent Mouth and MacNeal with "I See a Star". 1974 was the first year that allowed songs in English, so the lyrics were changed to English. At the contest, they had to face ABBA, former winner Gigliola Cinquetti and Olivia Newton-John before eventually finishing third. Teach In with "Ding-a-dong" won the 1975 Nationaal Songfestival, which was the first time since 1970 that the singers weren't internally selected. The song received six twelve points, winning the contest for the fourth time, being the first song to win while opening the contest.

1976–1985: Multiple hostings

The Hague hosted the 1976 contest in Congresgebouw with former winner Corry Brokken presenting the show. Sandra Reemer returned with "The Party's Over" finishing 9th. The country slumped to three non top-tens after, "De mallemolen" with Heddy Lester, 12th, "'t Is OK" with Harmony, 13th, and Xandra, the psedonym of Sandra Reemer, with "Colorado", finishing 12th. The congresbouw returned to host 1980 contest after Israel declined hosting after winning twice in a row and withdrew, because the date of the contest coincided with their Remembrance Day. Rogier van Otterloo made a debut as a conductor. Maggie MacNeal entered with the song "Amsterdam". The song would be the last internally selected song until 2013. "Amsterdam" led the voting after first three twelve points from four countries. The song later slipped to fifth. Linda Williams went to the 1981 contest with "Het is een wonder", finishing 7th. A year later, The Millionaires's "Fantasie eiland" controversially missed the ticket because expert juries sent Bill van Dijk with "Jij en ik". The English trio Tight Tit covered the song as Fantasy Island, which became a top 5 hit in the UK. In 1982 "Fantasie eiland" went on to win the OGAE Second Chance Contest. Germany's five points led "Jij en ik" to finished third last. The 1983 Nationaal Songfestival is also seen as dramatic. Vulcano's "Een beetje van dit" tied with Bernadette's "Sing Me a Song" before the last set of the jury votes gave Bernadette one point and Vulcano none, which sent her to Munich. The Netherlands finished 7th. After almost winning the Nationaal Songfestival in 1981, Maribelle represented the country in 1984 with "Ik hou van jou". The entry finished 13th, preceding the first ever Dutch withdrawal in 1985 due to the Remembrance of the Dead.

1986–1995: Mixed results leading to relegation

Girl group Frizzle Sizzle were the Dutch entry in 1986 with "Alles heeft ritme", which again finished 13th. At the 1987 edition of Nationaal Songfestival, Marcha performed all six competing songs, and "Rechtop in de wind" was selected. Marcha finished joint fifth, the Netherlands's first top five result since 1980. The song was the last conducted by van Otterloo before his death from cancer. In 1988, Gerard Joling was internally selected as the Dutch representative, and "Shangri-La" was later selected as the Dutch entry. The song finished ninth. Justine Pelmelay, a backing singer for "Shangri-La", won the selection in 1989 with the song "Blijf zoals je bent", which finished 15th. In 1990, The country was represented by sisters Maywood with the power ballad "Ik wil alles met je delen", again finishing 15th. As the contest was held on 4 May 1991, the Netherlands decided against participating due to the Remembrance of the Dead. Humphrey Campbell won the 1992 selection with "Wijs me de weg", which finished ninth. In 1993 and 1994, NOS opted to internally select the Dutch artist, and used the Nationaal Songfestival to select the Dutch song. In 1993, Ruth Jacott was selected as the artist, and "Vrede" was selected as the entry, finishing sixth. In 1994, Willeke Alberti was selected with the song "Waar is de zon?". The song placed 23rd with four points, and the Netherlands were relegated from the 1995 contest.

1996–2004: A decade of good results

Nationaal Songfestival returned in 1996 with five semi-finals to select a song for each singer. Maxine and Franklin Brown represented the country with "De eerste keer". The song finished seventh, after an error. Dick Bakker, co-writer of "Ding-a-dong", made his debut as a conductor. In 1997, Mrs. Einstein, which the German television jokingly announced as the Dutch Spice Grandmothers, represented the Netherlands with "Niemand heeft nog tijd" finishing tied 22nd with five points. Nurlaila's "Alsof je bij me bent" finished second in the pre-selection, but won the OGAE Second Chance Contest 1998. The highest-scoring entry that period was Edsilia Rombley's "Hemel en aarde": it even led the voting for some time. It was the last time the Netherlands was leader of the scoreboard until 2014. The song finished fourth, the Netherlands's best result since 1975. Marlayne won the Dutch final in 1999. She came joint 8th with the song "One Good Reason". In 2000, the song "No Goodbyes", sung by Linda Wagenmakers, placed 13th. In 2001, Michelle and her song "Out on My Own" finished 18th, and the Netherlands was not allowed to participate in 2002 due to poor results. Esther Hart won the national final in 2003 with the same writing team as 1999. Esther finished in 13th place. The country sent the male duo Re-union in 2004 with the song "Without You" and qualified for the final. They placed 20th with 11 points.

2005–2012: Non-qualification streak

In 2005, Glennis Grace's "My Impossible Dream" failed to reach the grand final. Treble also did not qualify a year later, with their song "Amambanda". In 2007, Rombley returned with her song "On Top of the World". She could not repeat her 1998 success and failed to qualify. In 2008, Hind participated with the song "Your Heart Belongs to Me": she too failed to qualify. In 2009, De Toppers's "Shine" failed to qualify. The year after, Sieneke was selected through a national final with "Ik ben verliefd (Sha-la-lie)" sung in Dutch - she also failed to qualify. The Netherlands missed out on the final eight years in a row, making it the country with the longest period of non-qualification in the contest.

2013–present: Qualification streaks and fifth victory
The string of consecutive non-qualifications of much of the 2000s and early 2010s led the Dutch broadcaster to re-think their strategy, which led to the internal selection of rock singer Anouk in 2013. Anouk chose the song "Birds" and the background singers herself and went on to break the Netherlands' long non-qualification streak, subsequently giving the country its first top 10 placing since 1999. The following years, the Dutch Eurovision committee continued to choose their artists internally. The year following Anouk, The Common Linnets (consisting of singers Ilse DeLange and Waylon) with "Calm After the Storm" won their semi-final and finished in second place overall. After a non-qualification with Trijntje Oosterhuis in 2015, the Dutch then recorded four consecutive qualifications with Douwe Bob and OG3NE both finishing in 11th place in their respective appearances, and returning singer Waylon placing 18th. Duncan Laurence brought the country its 5th overall victory (tying with France, Luxembourg and the United Kingdom) and first win in 44 years with his song "Arcade". As a result of the 2020 edition being cancelled due to the COVID-19 pandemic, Laurence became the longest reigning Eurovision winner, having held the title for two consecutive years. As the host entrant in 2021, Jeangu Macrooy with "Birth of a New Age" was pre-qualified for the final, eventually finishing in 23rd place with 11 points, marking the fifth time since 2015 that the host country ranked in the bottom five. Macrooy was previously chosen to represent the country in the later-cancelled 2020 edition with "Grow". For the 2022 contest, S10 represented the country with "De diepte", the first Dutch-language entry since Sieneke in 2010, and finished in 11th place in the final.

Non-participations
The Netherlands has missed only four contests in its Eurovision history.

But at 22:00 (UTC+2) on 13 May, the broadcast of the Eurovision final was halted as an explosion in a fireworks factory destroyed parts of a suburb in Enschede a few hours before. The points awarded by the Netherlands were taken from the back-up jury vote, as there was no televote after the program was cut short.

Participation overview

Hostings

Eurovision: Europe Shine a Light 
On 16 May 2020, Hilversum hosted the live show Eurovision: Europe Shine a Light as a replacement for the cancelled Eurovision Song Contest 2020.

Awards

Marcel Bezençon Awards

Barbara Dex Award

Related involvement

Conductors

Commentators and spokespersons

Over the years NOS/TROS commentary has been provided by several experienced radio and television presenters, including Willem Duys, Ivo Niehe, Pim Jacobs, Ati Dijckmeester and Paul de Leeuw. Willem van Beusekom provided NOS TV commentary every year from 1987 until 2005 (with the exceptions of 1991 and 1995). He was replaced by his co-commentator Cornald Maas, who commentated on the contest from 2004 until 2010.

On 29 June 2010, Maas was sacked as commentator after posting insults on Twitter about Sieneke, Joran van der Sloot and the Party for Freedom (PVV). After this, DJ Daniël Dekker, who had been commentating next to Maas, took over together with Jan Smit. In 2014, Maas returned, now himself replacing Dekker, as commentator together with Smit. Sander Lantinga replaced Smit for 2021 due to Smit hosting the main contest.

Gallery

See also
 Nationaal Songfestival
 Netherlands in the Junior Eurovision Song Contest – Junior version of the Eurovision Song Contest.
 Netherlands in the Eurovision Dance Contest – Dance version of the Eurovision Song Contest.
 Netherlands in the Eurovision Young Dancers – A competition organised by the EBU for younger dancers aged between 16 and 21.
 Netherlands in the Eurovision Young Musicians – A competition organised by the EBU for musicians aged 18 years and younger.

Notes

References

External links

 
Countries in the Eurovision Song Contest